Adrienne J. Smith (1934–1992) was an American psychologist. She came out as a lesbian in 1973 and became one of the first openly out lesbian psychologists in the American Psychological Association (APA). She worked for reforms in the APA and spoke on LGBT rights across the country.

Smith was born in 1934 and grew up in Chicago. Her family was Jewish, but not very religious. She attended the University of Illinois and later earned her doctorate at the University of Chicago. She had her private practice in Chicago and was one of the only options for therapy for many in the LGBT community.

Smith came out on television in 1973 on The David Susskind Show. She was one of the first psychologists in the American Psychological Association (APA) to live as an out lesbian. Her work with the APA helped stop homophobia in the organization. She was a leader in the APA Division 44, the Society for the Psychological Study of Lesbian and Gay Issues and served a term as president.

Smith was co-founder of the Woman's Institute in Chicago. She was an advocate for LGBT issues and rights in Chicago and across the country. She also spoke to Chicago City Council and the Illinois House of Representatives about LGBT issues. Smith was a co-author of Lesbians at Mid-Life: The Creative Transition.

Smith was inducted into the Chicago Gay and Lesbian Hall of Fame in 1991. She died on August 10, 1992 at the Illinois Masonic Medical Center.

References 

1934 births
1992 deaths
American women psychologists
20th-century American psychologists
American lesbian writers
American LGBT rights activists
People from Chicago
University of Illinois Chicago alumni
University of Chicago alumni
Jewish women writers
LGBT people from Illinois
20th-century American women writers
20th-century American people
20th-century American LGBT people
Inductees of the Chicago LGBT Hall of Fame
LGBT psychologists